Club Atlético Unión (mostly known as Unión de Santa Fe ) is a sports club from Santa Fe, the capital city of the Santa Fe Province, in Argentina. The club was founded on April 15, 1907 and plays in the Argentine Primera División.

Although Unión is mostly known for its football team, that currently plays in Primera División, the club hosts other sports such as archery, basketball, field hockey, gymnastics, martial arts, roller skating, swimming and volleyball.

History

In 1966, the squad was promoted to the Segunda División Argentina for the first time. Unión's supporters are called "unionistas", "tatengues", while the squad is usually nicknamed "El Tate". The colours of the club consist of red and white vertical stripes.

Managed by Juan Carlos Lorenzo in 1975, Unión made a great campaign in the 1975 championship with a group of notable players such as goalkeeper Hugo Gatti, midfielders Victorio Cocco and Rubén Suñé and forwards Ernesto Mastrángelo and Leopoldo Luque among others.

In 1979 Unión played the final matches of the Nacional championship, but lost at the hands of River Plate, because the goal scored by River in the first match (with a final score of 1–1) ended up in an average over Union according to the away goals rule applied to that tournament.

The most famous footballers who played for Unión are Leopoldo Luque, World Cup winner with Argentina in 1978, and Nery Pumpido, the goalkeeper of the national team that won the World Cup in Mexico 1986.

Apart from football, basketball is the foremost sport practised at the institution, with Union's team currently in the third division. Carlos Delfino is its most famous basketball player, and Mario Elie, champion in NBA (1994, 1995 y 1999), also played briefly in the Argentine League, for Unión de Santa Fe.

Rivalry

Unión and Colón are the two largest football clubs in Santa Fe. The Clásico Santafesino is known as one of football's fiercest and most important rivalries in Argentina. Unión and Colón have played 142 games all time against each other in the Amateur and Professional Era, with Unión winning 47, Colón winning 43 and 47 draws.

Players

Current squad
.

Out on loan

Notable players

To appear in this section a player must have played at least 50 games for the club and/or played officially for their national team.

  Alberto Galateo (1927–34)
  Julio Ávila (1948–49), (1955–56)
  José Vicente Grecco (1949–53)
  Victorio Cocco (1964–67)
  Néstor Scotta (1967–69)
  Mario Zanabria (1967–69)
  Roberto Martínez (1970)
  Leopoldo Luque (1971), (1973–75), (1980–81)
  Hugo Gatti (1974–75)
  Carlos Trullet (1974–77)
  Rubén Suñé (1975)
  Víctor Marchetti (1975–76), (1984)
  Roberto Telch (1976–79)
  Nery Pumpido (1976–81), (1991)
  Carlos Trucco (1977–81), (1984–85)
  Fernando Alí (1978–88)
  Ramón Centurión (1978–85), (1991–92)
  Osvaldo Escudero (1982–85)
   Daniel Morón (1983–88)
  Daniel Killer (1984–86)
  Alberto Acosta (1986–88)
  Ricardo Altamirano (1986–88)
  Edgardo Arasa (1986–88)
  Antony de Ávila (1987–88)
  Claudio Borghi (1990–91)
  Darío Cabrol (1990–92), (1994–00)
  Ricardo Giusti (1991–92)
  José Luis Marzo (1991–95), (1996–98)
  Nii Lamptey (1997)
  Danilo Aceval (1997–99)
  Pablo Cavallero (1998–99)
  Juan José Jayo (1998–00)
  Daniel Noriega (1998–00), (2001–02)
  Matías Donnet (1999–00), (2009–10)
  Andrés Silvera (1999–01)
  Daniel Tílger (1999–01)
  Martín Zapata (1999–04), (2006–09)
  Marcelo Mosset (1999–06), (2007–08)
  Fernando Ortiz (2000–03)
  Leonardo Fernández (2001)
  Rubén Capria (2001–03)
  Roberto Battión (2002–07)
  Ignacio Canuto (2004–07)

Managers

 Juan Carlos Lorenzo (1975–76)
 Reynaldo Volken (1977–79)
 Humberto Zucarelli (1988–90)
 Carlos Trullet (July 1990–Dec 91), (July 1995–June 98)
 Salvador Capitano (Jan 1999–June 99)
 Juan José López (1999)
 Nery Pumpido (July 1999–June 1)
 Leonardo Madelón (Jan 2001–Dec 01)
 Carlos Griguol (2002)
 Frank Kudelka (July 2002–Dec 02)
 Néstor Craviotto (July 2005–June 6)
 Carlos Trullet (July 2006–June 7)
 Fernando Quiroz (2008–09)
 Fernando Alí (Jul 2009–Jun 10)
 Frank Kudelka (June 2010–Sept 12)
 Nery Pumpido (Sept 2012–Dec 12)
 Facundo Sava (Dec 2012–Dec 13)
 Leonardo Madelón (Dec 2013–Nov 2016)
 Juan Pablo Pumpido (Nov 2016–Apr 2017)
 Pablo Marini (Apr 2017–Jun 2017)
 Leonardo Madelón (Jul 2017–Mar 2020)
 Marcelo Mosset (2020) (caretaker)
 Juan Manuel Azconzábal (Oct 2020–Oct 2021)
 Gustavo Munúa (Sept 2021–present)

Honours

National
 Primera B (1): 1966

Regional
Liga Santafesina de Fútbol (36): 1915, 1917, 1919, 1920, 1924, 1926, 1928, 1932, 1934, 1935, 1936, 1938, 1939, 1940, 1942, 1953, 1954, 1955,  1956, 1959, 1960, 1961, 1962, 1963, 1964, 1965, 1966, Classificatorio 1971, Selectivo 1971, 1971, 1974, 1979, 1994, Apertura 2000, Apertura 2003, Apertura 2010

References

External links

  

 
Association football clubs established in 1907
Football clubs in Santa Fe Province
Basketball teams in Argentina
Argentine field hockey clubs
Argentine volleyball teams
1907 establishments in Argentina